The National Autistic Society is the leading charity for autistic people and their families in the UK. Since 1962, the National Autistic Society has been providing support, guidance and advice, as well as campaigning for improved rights, services and opportunities to help create a society that works for autistic people.

The mission of the charity is to transform lives and change attitudes to help create a society that works for autistic people.

Activities
The National Autistic society is a member of the All Party Parliamentary Group on Autism.

The National Autistic Society is also a founding member of Autism-Europe, an umbrella organisation bringing together 80 autism organisations from over 30 European countries. As a member of Autism-Europe, the National Autistic Society collaborates and shares examples of learning and good practice with other associations throughout the continent.

The current Chief Executive is Caroline Stevens. She took over from Mark Lever in 2019, after being Chief Executive at Kids for six years.

Organisation
Over 3,000 people work for the National Autistic Society in schools and services as well as training, fundraising, policy and campaigns teams.

Led by their Chief Executive, Caroline Stevens, the National Autistic Society's strategic management group of seven directors is accountable to the Board of Trustees.

The president of the National Autistic Society is Jane Asher and the patron is The Duchess of Edinburgh. The National Autistic Society is funded through UK government grants and voluntary contributions.

The National Autistic Society has the following names registered with the Charity Commission:
The National Autistic Society
National Society for Autistic Children
Autism UK
Action for Autism

List of National Autistic Society schools and facilities
The National Autistic Society manages a number of schools in the United Kingdom:

 
The National Autistic Society also runs services for autistic adults.

History
The organisation was founded on 23 January 1962 as the Autistic Children's Aid Society of North London by parents of autistic children living in the area, with the assistance of a member from the Spastics Society (later Scope). It was renamed the Society for Autistic Children later that year, the National Society for Autistic Children in 1966, and the National Autistic Society in 1975.

In 1963, Gerald Gasson, a parent and member of the Executive Committee, designed the primary symbol for autism: a puzzle piece with a picture of a crying child inside of it, which was first used as logo by the NAS itself. In 1965, The Society School for Autistic Children was established, later renamed as the Sybil Elgar School after their first principal. It was described as "the first of its kind in the UK, and, it is thought, the world", and quickly became an example for how autistic people should be taught, and influenced the TEACCH methods in the US.

Awards and nominations

References

External links

Official website

Health charities in the United Kingdom
Autism-related organisations in the United Kingdom
1962 establishments in the United Kingdom
Organizations established in 1962
Charities for disabled people based in the United Kingdom